The Lisbon Council is a Brussels-based think tank that focuses on matters of innovation and European competitiveness. As of 2021, its President is Paul Hofheinz.

Background and activity

Its name refers to the Lisbon Strategy, adopted by the European Union in 2000 and aiming to make the EU "the most competitive and dynamic knowledge-based economy in the world capable of sustainable economic growth with more and better jobs and greater social cohesion" by 2010.

Its work themes include digital society, digital sovereignty, artificial intelligence, future of work, innovation, innovation-driven growth, R&D, evidence-based policymaking, economy, jobs, sustainability, fiscal sustainability, education and human capital, energy, environment, startups, SMEs, entrepreneurs, the data economy, and the future of Europe.

See also
 Bruegel (think tank)
 Centre for European Policy Studies
 ECIPE
 Eurofi

Notes

European integration think tanks
Political and economic think tanks based in the European Union
Think tanks based in Belgium
Think tanks established in 2003